In Greek mythology, Oizys is the goddess of misery, anxiety, grief, depression, and misfortune. Her Roman name is Miseria, from which the English word misery is derived. Oizys is a minor goddess without a great cult following, but a primordial goddess of misery and depression with a certain amount of mythological weight nonetheless.

Family 
Oizys was the parthenogenous daughter of the primordial goddess Nyx, the goddess of night, according to Hesiod, although sometimes Erebus, the god of deep darkness and Nyx's consort, is said to have been her father. Oizys is functionally a name in a catalogue, and has no distinct mythology of her own.

See also 
 Achlys
 Hybris (mythology)
 Ponos
 Algos

Notes

References 
 Gaius Julius Hyginus, Fabulae from The Myths of Hyginus translated and edited by Mary Grant. University of Kansas Publications in Humanistic Studies. Online version at the Topos Text Project.
 Hesiod, Theogony from The Homeric Hymns and Homerica with an English Translation by Hugh G. Evelyn-White, Cambridge, MA.,Harvard University Press; London, William Heinemann Ltd. 1914. Online version at the Perseus Digital Library. Greek text available from the same website.
 Marcus Tullius Cicero, Nature of the Gods from the Treatises of M.T. Cicero translated by Charles Duke Yonge (1812-1891), Bohn edition of 1878. Online version at the Topos Text Project.
 Marcus Tullius Cicero, De Natura Deorum. O. Plasberg. Leipzig. Teubner. 1917.  Latin text available at the Perseus Digital Library.

External links 
 OIZYS from The Theoi Project

Personifications in Greek mythology
Greek goddesses
Children of Nyx